A by-election for the seat of Araluen in the Northern Territory Legislative Assembly was held on 19 April 1986. The by-election was triggered by the resignation of Country Liberal Party (CLP) member Jim Robertson, a former Cabinet Minister. The seat and its predecessor Gillen had been held by Robertson since its creation in 1974.

The CLP selected Eric Poole, Chairman of the Northern Territory Tourism Commission. The Labor candidate was Di Shanahan.

Results

References

1986 elections in Australia
Northern Territory by-elections